Enrique "Kike" Barja Afonso (born 1 April 1997) is a Spanish footballer who plays for CA Osasuna mainly as a right winger.

Club career
Born in Noáin, Navarre, Barja joined CA Osasuna's youth setup in 2005 at the age of eight. He made his senior debut for the reserves on 25 August 2013 at the age of 16, coming on as a second-half substitute for Miguel Olavide and scoring the last in a 2–0 Tercera División home win against CD Huarte.

On 28 November 2015, Barja scored a brace in a 4–0 away routing over UD Mutilvera; he added another double seven days later, in a 5–0 thrashing of CD Erriberri. The following 25 September, he again scored two goals in a 3–1 home win against CD Guijuelo in the Segunda División B.

On 15 May 2017, Barja was definitely promoted to the main squad ahead of the 2017–18 season. He made his first team – and La Liga – debut five days later, replacing Carlos Clerc in a 0–5 away loss to Sevilla FC, as his side was already relegated.

Career statistics

Club

Honours
Osasuna
Segunda División: 2018–19

References

External links

1997 births
Living people
Spanish footballers
Footballers from Navarre
Association football wingers
La Liga players
Segunda División players
Segunda División B players
Tercera División players
CA Osasuna B players
CA Osasuna players